Blessed Maria Pia Mastena (7 December 1881 - 28 June 1951) - born Teresa Maria - was an Italian Roman Catholic professed religious and the founder of the Religious Sisters of the Holy Face. Mastena fostered a deep devotion to the Holy Face of Jesus and tried to promote that devotion to others in her religious career as a nun. Mastena first desired the contemplative life but was denied this after she entered the convent since it was not a cloister. Instead she dedicated herself to teaching in several Italian cities after having left another convent and another religious order when she deemed contemplative life was not the life she felt God wanted for her. Her labors were dedicated instead to consolidating her new religious order which began to grow after World War II until her sudden death in 1951.

Mastena's beatification process opened on 23 June 1990 under Pope John Paul II who later named Mastena as Venerable in 2002 after having confirmed her heroic virtue. Her beatification was celebrated in late 2005.

Life

Childhood and religious beginnings
Teresa Maria Mastena was born in Bovolone on 7 December 1881 as the first of five children to Giulio Mastena and Maria Antonia Casarotti. Her father worked as a small businessman and grocer and her mother served as a teacher. Her siblings were:
 Tarcisio (the lastborn child; became a priest in the Order of Friars Minor Capuchin and served in the missions in Brazil)
 Giuseppe (married)
 Maddalena (became a member of the Secular Franciscan Order)
 Plinio (was unable to become a priest due to poor health so obtained a law degree to help poorer people)
Her baptism was celebrated in the local parish church on 29 December 1881.

Mastena received her First Communion on 19 March 1891 and straight after that made a private vow to remain chaste in devotion to God. Her Confirmation was made on 27 August 1891.

Mastena began her initial schooling at home in which her mother taught her before she was attended to a kindergarten that the Sisters of Mercy managed. In her adolescence she was active in parish activities and acted as a catechist for the children. It was in 1891 that she reported her first experience that centered on a devotion to the Holy Face of Jesus. Mastena later asked to enter the religious life in 1895 as a teenager but was accepted as a postulant much later on 3 September 1901 at the Institute of the Sisters of Mercy of Verona. On 29 September 1902 she commenced her novitiate period and assumed the religious habit. 24 October 1903 she professed her perpetual vows and assumed the religious name "Passitea Maria of the Child Jesus".

Teaching and cloister
In October 1905 she completed her studies at the Institute of "Carlo Montanari" in Verona and obtained a diploma as a schoolteacher; she received a further teaching qualification on 7 October 1907 and then one as a kindergarten teacher in August–September 1908. In 1905 she began teaching and on 28 October 1908 she began teaching at the new center of the order in Miane (in the hills of Treviso) prior to soon becoming its director. During World War I she continued to be active in Miane and was quite close to the scene of the battle of the Piave. On 7 July 1912 she established an orphanage in Miane as well as a recreational club in 1917-1918. But after the war came events that had a profound impact on her: the death of her mother led her to seek seclusion as a nun which was something that her superiors did not permit. To that end she left the order and on 15 April 1927 entered the San Giacomo di Veglia convent (in Vittorio Veneto) as a Cistercian nun where she assumed the religious name "Maria Pia". Mastena was clothed in the Cistercian habit for the first time on 2 June 1927 when she commenced her period of novitiate. In the cloister she became known for her strict adherence to the order's Rule and for her deep devotion to both the Eucharist and the Passion of Jesus.

Congregation founding
On 15 November 1927 the Bishop of Vittorio Veneto Eugenio Beccegato (her spiritual director) asked her to leave the convent and resume teaching after Mastena had doubts as to whether the contemplative life was meant for her. This was something that she had confided prior to Beccegato. Mastena did this from 1927 until 1930 first in Miane (1927–28) before teaching in Follina Carpesica (1928–30) and then in San Fior (1930–36) where she opened a nursery school and a soup kitchen. In this period she began to form the idea of a congregation dedicated to the Face of Christ which was rooted in her devotion to a significant degree. In San Fior in 1930 she organized a small order called Pious Rescue which was aimed at assisting poor children and teaching them a trade. Soon a large number of aspiring sisters began to gather around Mastena and in October 1932 the local bishop approved of this order. From 1935 to 1936 the new order was dissolved twice due to the opposition from some local priests to accept her. But after a trip to Rome on 8 December 1936 she obtained recognition of her congregation on a diocesan level from the local bishop.

Towards the middle of the 1940s the order began establishing small offices in other Italian cities and on 12 May 1940 met Pope Pius XII in a private audience to discuss her work. This was during World War II and Mastena's order participated in relief activities for soldiers and victims of the conflict and fed them free of charge and without distinction between Italians or Germans or Jews since no side existed in their view. The decisive moment for her order came after Pope Pius XII confirmed her order as one of pontifical right on 10 December 1947. The purpose of the order is to aid in the sick in nursing homes as well as to help aspiring priests. On 8 December 1948 - at the order's first General Chapter - she was made the order's first Superior-General and she held that position until her death. In 1949 she decided to also establish clinic in Rome which the Sisters of the Holy Face were to run.

Ill health and death
From 1950 to 1951 she began to have health problems of a serious nature which included a heart attack and had to suspend her activities and trips to Rome. Her health took a grave turn in March 1951. Mastena's sudden death came the evening on 28 June 1951; her funeral was held both in Rome (on 1 July) and in San Fior (on 4 July). Her remains were first buried in Campo Verano but later moved to the San Fior motherhouse in a chapel on 26 December 1953. In 2005 her order had 143 professed nuns in 22 houses which extend to Brazil and Indonesia.

Beatification

The beatification process opened on 23 June 1990 after the Congregation for the Causes of Saints issued the "nihil obstat" (no objections) and titled Mastena as a Servant of God. The diocesan process for the investigation opened in Rome on 24 September 1990 and was closed at a Mass on 30 April 1992. The C.C.S. later validated the process on 30 April 1993 in a decree and received the Positio dossier from the cause's officials (the postulation) in 1994 for additional assessment.

The theologians tasked to assess the cause approved the dossier's contents on 17 March 2002 while the cardinal and bishop members comprising the C.C.S. agreed with this decision at their meeting on 7 May 2002. Pope John Paul II confirmed that Mastena had lived a model life of heroic virtue and named the late religious as Venerable on 5 July 2002.

Mastena's beatification required a miracle to receive papal confirmation in order for beatification to take place. The process for one case was held from 2000 to 2001 though further research in Rome could not occur until Mastena had been named as Venerable. That happened in 2002 at which stage medical experts met to discuss and approve the miraculous nature of the healing on 4 December 2002. Theologians concurred in this verdict on 26 March 2004 and the C.C.S. members also voiced their approval on 1 June 2004. On 22 June the pope provided the final assent needed which confirmed Mastena's beatification to be held.

The beatification was held on 13 November 2005 in Saint Peter's Basilica with Cardinal José Saraiva Martins presiding on the behalf of Pope Benedict XVI who made remarks at the conclusion of the beatification. Benedict XVI stated in his remarks following the beatification Mass:
Won over by the Face of Christ, she assumed the Son of God's sentiments of sweet concern for humanity disfigured by sin, put into practice his acts of compassion and subsequently planned an Institute whose aim was to "propagate, repair and restore Jesus' gentle image in souls".

The current postulator for this cause is the Passionist priest Giovanni Zubiani.

See also

Apostle of the Holy Face
Holy Face of Jesus
Gaetano Catanoso
Maria Pierina
Marie of St Peter

Further reading
 Beata Maria Pia Mastena by Nicola Gori 2005 San Paolo Edizioni (Jan 1 2005) (in Italian)

Notes and references

External links
 Hagiography Circle
 Pope Benedict XVI's remarks at the end of the beatification Mass

1881 births
1951 deaths
20th-century Italian Roman Catholic religious sisters and nuns
20th-century venerated Christians
Beatifications by Pope Benedict XVI
Catholic spirituality
Founders of Catholic religious communities
Italian beatified people
People from Bovolone
Venerated Catholics by Pope John Paul II